Jayden Tanner (born 25 July 2000) is an Australian professional rugby league footballer who plays as a  for the Canterbury-Bankstown Bulldogs in the NRL.

Background
Tanner was born in Sydney, New South Wales. While attending Patrician Brothers' College, Blacktown, he was an Australian Schoolboys representative in 2018. He played his junior rugby league for the Hills District Bulls. In 2019, the Penrith Panthers signed him to a development contract.

Playing career
In 2022, Tanner joined the Canterbury-Bankstown Bulldogs. In round 1 of the 2023 NRL season, Tanner made his first grade debut in his side's 31–6 loss to the Manly Warringah Sea Eagles at Brookvale Oval.

References

External links
Canterbury Bulldogs profile

2000 births
Australian rugby league players
Rugby league props
Canterbury-Bankstown Bulldogs players
Rugby league
Living people